Wan Xueyuan (born January 1941) is a politician of the People's Republic of China. He currently serves as the vice director of foreign affairs committee of 11th Chinese People's Political Consultative Conference (CPPCC).

Born in Huanggang, Hubei Province, Wan joined the Chinese Communist Party in June, 1961. He graduated from the department of naval dynamics of Shanghai Jiao Tong University in 1964. 

Wan served as the secretary-general of the government of Shanghai. In September 1992, Wan became the vice governor of Zhejiang. From January, 1993 to April, 1997, he served as the Governor of Zhejiang. Between 1997 and 2006, he served as Vice-Minister of Human Resources and Social Security.

References

1941 births
People's Republic of China politicians from Hubei
Living people
Politicians from Huanggang
Governors of Zhejiang
Chinese Communist Party politicians from Hubei